The Open Commons Consortium (aka OCC - formerly the Open Cloud Consortium) is a 501(c)(3) non-profit venture which provides cloud computing and data commons resources to support "scientific, environmental, medical and health care research."  OCC manages and operates resources including the  Open Science Data Cloud (aka OSDC), which is a multi-petabyte scientific data sharing resource. The consortium is based in Chicago, Illinois, and is managed by the 501(c)3 Center for Computational Science Research.

Partnerships and engagements
The OCC was among six partners engaged by the Global Lambda Integrated Facility to establish a testbed for a 100 Gbit/s data transmission capability.

The OCC is divided into Working Groups which include:
 The Open Science Data Cloud - This is a working group that manages and operates the Open Science Data Cloud (OSDC), which is a petabyte scale science cloud for researchers to manage, analyze and share their data. Individual researchers may apply for accounts to analyze data hosted by the OSDC. Research projects with TB-scale datasets are encouraged to join the OSDC and contribute towards its infrastructure. 
 Project Matsu - Project Matsu is a collaboration between the NASA Goddard Space Flight Center and the Open Commons Consortium to develop open source technology for cloud-based processing of satellite imagery to support the earth science research community as well as human assisted disaster relief. 
 The Open Cloud Testbed - This working group manages and operates the Open Cloud Testbed. The Open Cloud Testbed (OCT) is a geographically distributed cloud testbed spanning four data centers and connected with 10G and 100G network connections. The OCT is used to develop new cloud computing software and infrastructure.
 The Biomedical Data Commons - The Biomedical Data Commons (BDC) is cloud-based infrastructure that provides secure, compliant cloud services for managing and analyzing genomic data, electronic medical records (EMR), medical images, and other PHI data. It provides resources to researchers so that they can more easily make discoveries from large complex controlled access datasets. The BDC provides resources to those institutions in the BDC Working Group. It is an example of what is sometimes called condominium model of sharing research infrastructure in which the research infrastructure is operated by a consortium of educational and research organizations and provides resources to the consortium.
 NOAA Data Alliance Working Group - The OCC National Oceanographic and Atmospheric Administration (NOAA) Data Alliance Working Group supports and manages the NOAA data commons and the surrounding community interested in the open redistribution of NOAA datasets.

In 2015, the OCC was accepted into the Matter healthcare community at Chicago's historic Merchandise Mart.   Matter is a community healthcare entrepreneurs and industry leaders working together in a shared space to individually and collectively fuel the future of healthcare innovation.

In 2015, the OCC announced a collaboration with the National Oceanic and Atmospheric Administration (NOAA) to help release their vast stores of environmental data to the general public.   This effort is managed by the OCC's NOAA data alliance working group.

Consortium members

US Cities
City of Chicago

Companies
Aerospace Corporation
Booz Allen Hamilton
Citrix
Cisco
CliQr
The HDF Group
Infoblox
Force10
Mercury Intelligence Systems
Open Data Group
Raytheon
SIOS
TexelTek
UCAR/Unidata
Yahoo
Intel

Universities
Calit2, University of California, San Diego
Florida International University
Johns Hopkins University
StarLight, Northwestern University
University of Chicago
University of Illinois at Chicago
Carnegie Mellon University
NORC at the University of Chicago
 University of California, Berkeley (from 2012)
 The Geographic Information Systems Research Center at Feng Chia University, Taiwan (from October 2012)
University of the West Indies
Ontario Institute for Cancer Research
The University of Edinburgh

Government agencies
Lawrence Livermore National Laboratory
NASA
Oak Ridge National Laboratory
National Institute of Advanced Industrial Science and Technology, Japan

References

501(c)(3) organizations
Organizations based in Chicago